Mantan Moreland (September 3, 1902 – September 28, 1973) was an American actor and comedian most popular in the 1930s and 1940s. He starred in numerous films. His daughter Marcella Moreland appeared as a child actress in several films.

Early years
He was born in Monroe, Louisiana, to Frank, an old-time Dixieland bandleader, and Marcella. Moreland began acting by the time he was an adolescent; some sources say he ran away to join a minstrel show in 1910, at age eight, but his daughter told Moreland's biographer she doubts this date is correct. She and other sources agree it is more likely he left home when he was fourteen.

Career
After "nearly ten years of working the small, small time", Moreland gained an opportunity in 1927 when he was hired as a comedian in Connie's Inn Frolics in Harlem. He next worked in the musical revue Blackbirds of 1928, which ran for 518 performances. By the late 1920s, Moreland had made his way through vaudeville, working with various shows and revues, performing on Broadway and touring Europe.

Following the death of Aubrey Lyles, the half of African American vaudeville act Miller and Lyles, in 1932, Flournoy Miller asked Moreland to team up with him for personal appearances. With Moreland, Miller performed comedy routines he had done with Lyles. The pair performed together in the one-reel short film That's the Spirit (1933) as a pair of night watchmen and for stage productions by Miller, Dixie Goes High Hat (1938) and Hollywood Revue (1939). Moreland appeared in low-budget "race movies" aimed at African American audiences, including One Dark Night (1939) with Bette Treadville, Lucky Ghost (1941), Mr. Washington Goes to Town (1941) and Mantan Runs for Mayor (1946), again with Miller.

As his comedic talents became recognized, Moreland appeared in larger productions. At the height of his career, Moreland received steady work from major film studios, as well as from independent producers who starred Moreland in low-budget, all-African American-cast comedies. Monogram Pictures signed Moreland to appear opposite Frankie Darro in the studio's popular action pictures. Moreland, with his bulging eyes and cackling laugh, quickly became a favorite supporting player in Hollywood movies. In 1940's Drums of the Desert, Moreland played a more serious role as the sergeant in charge of a squad of Senegalese Tirailleurs in French colonial Algeria alongside Ralph Byrd, known for appearing in Republic Pictures' Dick Tracy serials. He is perhaps best known for his role as chauffeur Birmingham Brown in Monogram's Charlie Chan series.

During the 1940s, he teamed up with Ben Carter as his straight man, touring America in vaudeville and making personal appearances in the nation's movie theaters. Moreland and Carter performed comedy routines the former learned when he became Flournoy Miller's understudy in the 1930s, including the famous "indefinite talk" routine, in which they would speak to one another, start a sentence only to be interrupted by the other, yet they understand each other perfectly. Moreland and Carter had developed an excellent rapport and impeccable timing. During World War II, they performed at the then segregated USOs such as one in Riverside, California.  Their version of "indefinite talk" can be seen in two Charlie Chan pictures, The Scarlet Clue and Dark Alibi, as well as in the big-budget Universal musical Bowery to Broadway. The partnership lasted until Carter died in 1946. Moreland and Nipsey Russell performed this routine in two all-black variety films in 1955.

During the second half of the 1940s, the public attitudes toward the portrayals of African Americans in the cinema had changed. When filmmakers began to reassess roles given to black actors, Moreland's characterization in his film appearances was considered demeaning to the African-American community, resulting in his being offered fewer roles in the 1950s. Financial difficulties forced Moreland to tour making personal appearances during the late 1940s and the early 1950s with Bud Harris, Tim Moore, Redd Foxx and Nipsey Russell as his straight men.

Mantan's biographer, Michael Price, states Moreland was briefly considered as a possible addition to the Three Stooges. After Shemp Howard died of a sudden heart attack on November 22, 1955, at age 60, Moe Howard was said had been observing Moreland's act for years and offered Moreland a chance to join the act as the new "third stooge" at the behest of his late brother Shemp. Moreland was reported to be enthusiastic about the offer, but Columbia Pictures insisted on a comedian already under contract. Joe Besser, one of a few comedians still making comedy shorts at the studio, was eventually recruited to join the act in 1956.

Later career and death
Moreland's last featured role was in the darkly humorous horror film Spider Baby (1968, filmed in 1964), which was patterned after Universal's thrillers of the 1940s. After suffering a stroke in the early 1960s, Moreland took on a few minor comedic roles, working with Bill Cosby, Moms Mabley and Carl Reiner. He later partnered with Roosevelt Livingood to form the comedic team of Mantan and Livingood, which produced a number of recorded albums.

Moreland died of a cerebral hemorrhage in 1973 in Hollywood, and is interred at Valhalla Memorial Park Cemetery in North Hollywood, Los Angeles, California.

Recognition
In 2004, Moreland was inducted into the National Multicultural Western Heritage Museum Hall of Fame.

Selected filmography

 That's the Spirit (1933) as Night Watchman
 The Green Pastures (1936) as Angel Removing Hat (uncredited)
 Harlem on the Prairie (1937) as Mistletoe
 Spirit of Youth (1938) as Creighton 'Crickie' Fitzgibbons
 Two-Gun Man from Harlem (1938) as Bill Blake
 Frontier Scout (1938) as Norris Family Butler
 Next Time I Marry (1938) as Tilby
 Gang Smashers (1938) as Gloomy
 There's Always a Woman (1939) as Porter (uncredited)
 Tell No Tales (1939) as Sport Black at the Wake (uncredited)
 Riders of the Frontier (1939) as Chappie (Cookie in credits) 
 Irish Luck (1939) as Jefferson
 One Dark Night (1939) as Samson Brown
 The Man Who Wouldn't Talk (1940) as Robbins (uncredited)
 City of Chance (1940) as Anxious Man (uncredited)
 Chasing Trouble (1940) as Thomas H. Jefferson
 Millionaire Playboy (1940) as Bellhop
 Viva Cisco Kid (1940) as Memphis - The Cook (uncredited)
 Star Dust (1940) as George, Dining Car Steward (uncredited)
 Girl in 313 (1940) as Porter
 On the Spot (1940) as Jefferson White
 Maryland (1940) (uncredited) 
 Pier 13 (1940) as Sam - Elevator Operator (uncredited)
 Laughing at Danger (1940) as Jefferson
 Up in the Air (1940) as Jeff
 While Thousands Cheer (1940) as Nash
 Drums of the Desert (1940) as Sergeant 'Blue' Williams
 Four Shall Die (1940) as Beefus - Touissant's Chauffeur
 Lady from Louisiana (1941) as Servant (uncredited)
 You're Out of Luck (1941) as Jeff Jefferson
 Sleepers West (1941) as Porter (uncredited)
 Footlight Fever (1941) as Willie Hamsure - Elevator Operator (uncredited)
 Ellery Queen's Penthouse Mystery (1941) as Roy
 Sign of the Wolf (1941) as Ben
 Mr. Washington Goes to Town (1941) as Schenectady Jones
 King of the Zombies (1941) as Jeff
 Hello, Sucker (1941) as Elevator Boy
 Bachelor Daddy (1941) as Club Janitor (uncredited)
 The Gang's All Here (1941) as Jefferson 'Jeff' Smith
 Cracked Nuts (1941) as Burgess
 Accent on Love (1941) as Prisoner in Courtroom (uncredited)
 Dressed to Kill (1941) as Rusty
 World Premiere (1941) as Train Porter (uncredited)
 Let's Go Collegiate (1941) as Jeff
 It Started with Eve (1941) as Railway Porter (uncredited)
 Birth of the Blues (1941) as Black Trumpet Player (uncredited)
 Marry the Boss's Daughter (1941) as Cook (uncredited)
 Up Jumped the Devil (1941) as Washington
 Freckles Comes Home (1942) as Jeff - the Hotel Porter
 Treat 'Em Rough (1942) as 'Snake-Eyes'
 Four Jacks and a Jill (1942) as Cicero - Wash Room Attendant (uncredited)
 Law of the Jungle (1942) as Jefferson 'Jeff' Jones
 Lucky Ghost (1942) as Washington
 Professor Creeps (1942) as Washington
 The Strange Case of Doctor Rx (1942) as Horatio B.Fitz Washington
 Tarzan's New York Adventure (1942) as Sam, the Nightclub Janitor (uncredited)
 Mexican Spitfire Sees a Ghost (1942) as Lightnin'
 Footlight Serenade (1942) as Amos. Tommy's Dresser
 A-Haunting We Will Go (1942) as Porter (uncredited)
 Phantom Killer (1942) as Nicodemus 
 Girl Trouble (1942) as Edward
 Eyes in the Night (1942) as Alistair
 The Palm Beach Story (1942) as Diner Waiter (uncredited)
 Andy Hardy's Double Life (1942) as Prentiss the Benedict Butler (uncredited)
 It Comes Up Love (1943) as Janitor (uncredited)
 The Crime Smasher (1943) as Eustace Smith
 Cabin in the Sky (1943) as First Idea Man
 Slightly Dangerous (1943) as Waiter at Swade's (uncredited)
 He Hired the Boss (1943) as Shoeshine Man (uncredited)
 Sarong Girl (1943) as Maxwell
 Hit the Ice (1943) as Porter with Snowshoes (uncredited)
 We've Never Been Licked (1943) as Willie
 Melody Parade (1943) as Skidmore
 Revenge of the Zombies (1943) as Jeff
 Hi'ya, Sailor (1943) as Sam
 You're a Lucky Fellow, Mr. Smith (1943) as Porter
 My Kingdom for a Cook (1943) as Train Porter (uncredited)
 Swing Fever (1943) as Woody, Nick's Valet (uncredited)
 She's for Me (1943) as Sam
 Chip Off the Old Block (1944) as Porter
 Charlie Chan in the Secret Service (1944) as Birmingham Brown
 See Here, Private Hargrove (1944) as Porter on Train (uncredited)
 Moon Over Las Vegas (1944) as Porter
 Pin-Up Girl (1944) as Red Cap #2 (uncredited)
 This Is the Life (1944) as Porter (uncredited)
 The Chinese Cat (1944) as Birmingham Brown
 South of Dixie (1944) as The Porter
 Black Magic (1944) as Birmingham Brown
 Mystery of the River Boat (1944, serial) as Napoleon the ship steerer
 Bowery to Broadway (1944) as Alabam
 The Jade Mask (1945) as Birmingham Brown
 The Scarlet Clue (1945) as Birmingham Brown
 The Shanghai Cobra (1945) as Birmingham Brown
 Captain Tugboat Annie (1945) as Pinto
 She Wouldn't Say Yes (1945) as porter (uncredited)
 The Spider (1945) as Henry
 Mantan Messes Up (1946) as Mantan
 Riverboat Rhythm (1946) as Mantan
 Dark Alibi (1946) as Birmingham Brown
 Shadows Over Chinatown (1946) as Birmingham Brown
 The Trap (1946) as Birmingham Brown
 Tall, Tan, and Terrific (1946) as Mantan Moreland
 Mantan Runs for Mayor (1946)
 The Chinese Ring (1947) as Birmingham Brown
 Ebony Parade (1947) as Mantan
 What a Guy (1947)
The Dreamer (1947)
 Docks of New Orleans (1948) as Birmingham Brown
 Best Man Wins (1948) as Ice Cream Vendor (uncredited)
 Shanghai Chest (1948) as Birmingham Brown
 The Golden Eye (1948) as Birmingham Brown
 The Feathered Serpent (1948) as Birmingham Brown
 The Return of Mandy's Husband (1948)
 She's Too Mean for Me (1948) 
 Come on, Cowboy! (1948)
 Sky Dragon (1949) as Birmingham Brown
 Rock 'n' Roll Revue (1955) as Himself
 Basin Street Revue (1956) as Himself
 The Patsy (1964) as Barbershop Porter (uncredited)
 Spider Baby (filmed in 1964, released in 1968) as Messenger
 Alvarez Kelly (1966) as Bartender (uncredited)
 Enter Laughing (1967) as Subway Rider
 The Comic (1969) as Passerby at Billy's Funeral (uncredited)
 Watermelon Man (1970) as counterman
 The Biscuit Eater (1972) as Waiter
 The Young Nurses (1973) as Old man (final film role)

Television
 1957 Hallmark Hall of Fame (1 episode)
 1969 Julia (1 episode)
 1969 Love, American Style (1 episode)
 1970 The Bill Cosby Show (1 episode)
 1970 Adam-12 (1 episode)

Recordings
That Ain't My Finger (Laff)
Elsie's Sportin' House (Laff)
Tribute to the Man (Laff)

Cultural references
Robert B. Parker makes allusions to Moreland in A Catskill Eagle and Hush Money, both being part of his long-running series of Spenser novels.

Bamboozled, a 2000 film directed by Spike Lee, centers around a fictional television show called Mantan: The New Millennium Minstrel Show featuring stereotypes of minstrel theater and starring a tap dancing character, played by Savion Glover, named Mantan.

"B-Boys Makin with the Freak Freak", a song by Beastie Boys featured on their 1994 album Ill Communication, samples a line from Mantan's comedy album That Ain't My Finger, referencing a bit about a party and mashed potatoes.

Further reading
Michael H. Price - Mantan the Funnyman (2007), a biography of Moreland

Footnotes

Notes

References

External links

Mantan Moreland and Ben Carter perform their "Incomplete Sentences" routine in this YouTube clip

1902 births
1973 deaths
Male actors from Louisiana
African-American male actors
American male film actors
American male stage actors
American male television actors
Burials at Valhalla Memorial Park Cemetery
People from Monroe, Louisiana
Vaudeville performers
20th-century American male actors
20th-century African-American people